California Federal Bank, known as CalFed, was a savings bank headquartered in Los Angeles, California, at 5670 Wilshire Boulevard. It operated 352 branches, most of which were in California. In 2002, the bank was acquired by Citigroup.

History
The bank was founded in 1945 originally as California Federal Savings & Loan Association. In June 1989, California Federal Savings & Loan Association was renamed California Federal Bank.

In January 1993, the bank's stockholders voted to eliminate the bank's then holding company parent, CalFed Inc. (NYSE: CAL), as a means to raise more capital.

In 1994, the bank acquired Cornerstone Savings & Loan after it was shut down by regulators as a result of bank failure.

In August 1995, the bank reversed its 1993 decision to eliminate its holding company and formed Cal Fed Bancorp, Inc. (NYSE: CAL) as its new parent.

In 1997, First Nationwide Holdings Inc., the parent company of First Nationwide Bank, acquired the bank's then parent, Cal Fed Bancorp, and converted its First Nationwide Bank offices to the California Federal name. Since 1994, First Nationwide Holdings Inc. was owned 80% by Ronald Perelman and 20% by Gerald J. Ford. 

In 1998, Golden State Bancorp (NYSE: GSB), the parent of Glendale Federal Bank, acquired the bank and moved the headquarters from Los Angeles to San Francisco with the merged institution using the California Federal Bank name. In 2000, the bank's auto loan subsidiary acquired Downey Auto Finance.

In 2002, Citigroup acquired the bank for $5.8 billion.

References

External links

Defunct banks of the United States
1945 establishments in California
Banks established in 1945
2002 disestablishments in California
Banks disestablished in 2002